Sharh al-Mawahib al-Ladunniyyah is an eight volumes collection authored by Islamic scholar Muhammad al-Zurqani, a commentary of Al-Qastallani's Al-Muwahib al-Ladunniyyah.

See also
List of Sunni books

References

Sunni literature